Spalding & Hodge was a London based manufacturing stationer and paper merchant founded on 23 November 1789 by Thomas Spalding and John Hodge. Initially operating from The Strand they moved to Drury Lane in 1797. The company remained in business until after the Second World War when it was eventually sold.

In the nineteenth century the company had the largest share of the British book paper market.

Board members:[2]

References

2. Spalding & Hodge (1921). Past and Present 1796-1921

External links
A substantial quantity of papers of this company are held by the London Metropolitan Archive: [http://discovery.nationalarchives.gov.uk/details/r/a640745c-312b-406d-a71d-9c59e17e1c1b]
125th anniversary brochure
150th anniversary brochure

Defunct manufacturing companies of the United Kingdom